The Wrong Hands: Popular Weapons Manuals and Their Historic Challenges to a Democratic Society is a 2015 book by Ann Larabee on the history government responses to do-it-yourself weapons manuals.

References

External links 

 
 October 2014 interview on WLNZ
 Reddit AMA

2015 non-fiction books
English-language books
Oxford University Press books